Minimal logic, or minimal calculus, is a symbolic logic system originally developed by Ingebrigt Johansson. It is an intuitionistic and paraconsistent logic, that rejects both the law of the excluded middle as well as the principle of explosion (ex falso quodlibet), and therefore holding neither of the following two derivations as valid:

Most constructive logics only reject the former, the law of excluded middle. In classical logic, the ex falso laws 
 
 
 
Minimal logic also rejects those principles.

Axiomatization 
Minimal logic is axiomatized over the positive fragment of intuitionistic logic. Both of these logics may be formulated in the language using the same axioms and 
implication , 
conjunction  and 
disjunction  as the basic connectives, but Minimal Logic adds 
falsum or absurdity as part of the language.
Alternatively, direct axioms for negation are discussed below.

Theorems
Here only theorems not already provable in the positive calculus are covered.

Negation introduction 
A quick analysis of implication and negation laws gives a good indication of what this logic, lacking full explosion, can and cannot prove.

A natural statement in a language with negation, such as Minimal logic, is, for example, the principle of negation introduction, whereby the negation of a statement is proven by assuming it and deriving a contradiction. Formally, this may be expressed as, for any two propositions,
.
For  taken as the contradiction  itself, this establishes the law of non-contradiction
.

With this and implication elimination, the above introduction principle implies
,
i.e. assuming any contradiction, every proposition can be negated. Negation introduction is possible in minimal logic, so here a contradiction moreover proves every double negation . Explosion would permit to remove the latter double negation, but this principle is not adopted.

Moreover, using the above
.
This is to be compared with the full disjunctive syllogism.

Axiomatization via absurdity 
One possible scheme of extending the positive calculus to minimal logic is to treat  as an implication, in which case the theorems from the implication calculus of a logic carry over to negation statements.
Constructively,  represents a proposition for which there can be no reason to believe it.

The already discussed principles can then be from theorems over the positive fragment.
Negation introduction, spelled out in the previous section, is implied as a mere special case of

when . In this way, minimal logic can be characterized as a constructive logic just without negation elimination (a.k.a. explosion).
The above can is proved via modus ponens, which as a proposition reads

and is indeed a special case of the above, when  is true.
With the definition of negation through , the modus ponens statement itself can in the same way again be specialized, and then establishes the non-contradiction principle, also already spelled out above. Indeed, all the common intuitionistic implications involving conjunctions of two propositions can be obtained, including the currying equivalence. For an example, it is worth emphasizing the important equivalence
,
expressing that those are two equivalent ways of the saying that both  and  imply .
Firstly, from it the familiar De Morgan's laws is obtained, 
.
Secondly, using it to dissolve one implication from a disjunction as antecedent into two implications, it follows that

and this reduces to the double negation of excluded middle

By implication introduction,

This also already implies  showing directly how assuming  in minimal logic proves all negations. This has spelled out above as well, but here may be shortened to

Axiomatization via more principles 
From 
follows

Related to the negation introduction principle, from
.
minimal logic proves the contraposition

Adopting the above double negation principle together with the contraposition principle gives an alternative axiomatization of minimal logic over the positive fragment of intuitionistic logic.

Unprovable sentences 
The tactic of generalizing  to  does not work to prove all classically valid statements involving double negations. Note that any schema of the syntactic shape  is too strong to be provable: If it were provable, then any true proposition  would prove any other proposition . It shows, possibly unsurprisingly, that the naive generalization of the double negation elimination  cannot be provable in this way.

Therefore, adopting the full double negation principle  in minimal logic brings the calculus back to classical logic, also skipping all intermediate logics.

There are also propositional logic statements that are unprovable in minimal logic, but do hold intuitionistically. With explosion for negated statements, full explosion is equivalent to its special case . The latter can be phrased as double negation elimination for rejected propositions, . This principle also immediately proves the full disjunctive syllogism.
So this is a relatively weak schema leading to the stronger intuitionistic logic.

As seen above, the double negated excluded middle for any proposition is already provable in minimal logic. However, it is worth emphasizing that in the predicate calculus, the laws of minimal logic do not enable a proof of the double negation of an infinite conjunction of excluded middle statements. Indeed, the double negation shift schema (DNS)
 
is not even intuitionistically valid and neither is 
. 
Beyond arithmetic, this allows for non-classical theories.

Relation to intuitionistic logic 
Any formula using only  is provable in minimal logic if and only if it is provable in intuitionistic logic.

The principle of explosion is valid in intuitionistic logic and expresses that to derive any and all propositions, one may do this by deriving any absurdity. In minimal logic, this principle does not axiomatically hold for arbitrary propositions. As minimal logic represents only the positive fragment of intuitionistic logic, it is a subsystem of intuitionistic logic and is strictly weaker. 

Formulated concisely, explosion in intuitionistic logic exactly grants particular cases of the double negation elimination principle that minimal logic does not have.

Disjunctive syllogism 
Practically, in the intuitionistic context, the principle of explosion enables the disjunctive syllogism: 

In this way, the syllogism is an unpacking principle for the disjunction. It can be seen as a formal consequence of explosion and it also implies it. This is because if  was proven by proving  then  is already proven, while if  was proven by proving , then  also follows, as the intuitionistic system allows for explosion.

For example, given a constructive argument that a coin flip resulted in either heads or tails ( or ), together with a constructive argument that the outcome was in fact not heads, the syllogism expresses that then this already constitutes an argument that tails occurred. 

If the minimal logic system is metalogically assumed consistent, then that implication formula can be expressed by saying that  merely cannot be rejected. 

Weak forms of explosion prove the disjunctive syllogism and in the other direction, the instance of the syllogism with  reads  and is equivalent to the double negation elimination for propositions for which excluded middle holds
.
As the material conditional grants double-negation elimination for proven propositions, this is again equivalent to double negation elimination for rejected propositions.

Intuitionist example of use in a theory 
The following Heyting arithmetic theorem allows for proofs of existence claims that cannot be proven, by means of this general result, without the explosion principle. The result is essentially a family of simple double negation elimination claims, -sentences binding a computable predicate. 

Let  be any quantifier-free predicate, and thus decidable for all numbers , so that excluded middle holds,
. 

As with examples discussed previously, a proof of this requires explosion on the antecedent side to obtain propositions without negations. 
.
The next case  states the double negation elimination for a decidable predicate,
.
The  case reads
,
which, as already noted, is equivalent to
.
Of course, a statement  for fixed  and  may be provable by other means, using principles of minimal logic.

As an aside, the unbounded schema for general decidable predicates is not even intuitionistically provable, see Markov's principle.

Relation to type theory

Use of negation 
Absurdity  is used not only in natural deduction, but also in type theoretical formulations under the Curry–Howard correspondence. 
In type systems,  is often also introduced as the empty type. 

In many contexts,  need not be a separate constant in the logic but its role can be replaced with any rejected proposition. For example, it can be defined as  where  ought to be distinct. The claim of non-existence of a proof for that proposition is then a claim of consistency. 

This may also be adopted for in plain constructive logic.
With this, proving  to be false, i.e. , just means to prove . We may introduce the notation  to capture the claim as well.
And indeed, using arithmetic,  holds, but  also implies . So this would imply  and hence we obtain . QED.

Simple types 
Functional programming calculi already foremostly depend on the implication connective, see e.g. the calculus of constructions for a predicate logic framework.

In this section we mention the system obtained by restricting minimal logic to implication only, and describe it formally.
It can be defined by the following sequent rules:

                        

Each formula of this restricted minimal logic corresponds to a type in the simply typed lambda calculus, see Curry–Howard correspondence. In that context, the phrase minimal logic is sometimes used to mean this restriction of minimal logic. This implicational fragment of minimal logic is the same as the positive, implicational fragment of intuitionistic logic since minimal Logic is already simply the positive fragment of intuitionistic logic.

Semantics  
There are semantics of minimal logic that mirror the frame-semantics of intuitionistic logic, see the discussion of semantics in paraconsistent logic. Here the valuation functions assigning truth and falsity to propositions can be subject to fewer constraints.

See also 
 Intuitionistic logic
 Paraconsistent logic
 Implicational propositional calculus
 List of logic systems

References

 A.S. Troelstra and H. Schwichtenberg, 2000, Basic Proof Theory, Cambridge University Press, 

Non-classical logic
Constructivism (mathematics)
Systems of formal logic